Kiera Leigh Aitken (born 31 October 1983) is an Olympic and national-record holding swimmer from Bermuda. She is one of Bermuda's most successful swimmers, and has twice been named Bermuda's Female Athlete of the Year (for 2004 and 2009). She carried Bermuda's flag at the Opening Ceremonies of the 2010 Commonwealth Games.

She has swum for Bermuda at:
Olympics: 2004, 2008
Commonwealth Games: 2006, 2010
World Championships: 2007, 2009
Pan American Games: 2003, 2007

She swam in college at Canada's Dalhousie University.

References

1983 births
Living people
Swimmers at the 2004 Summer Olympics
Swimmers at the 2008 Summer Olympics
Swimmers at the 2003 Pan American Games
Swimmers at the 2007 Pan American Games
Swimmers at the 2011 Pan American Games
Pan American Games competitors for Bermuda
Bermudian female swimmers
Olympic swimmers of Bermuda
Commonwealth Games competitors for Bermuda
Swimmers at the 2006 Commonwealth Games
Swimmers at the 2010 Commonwealth Games
Dalhousie University alumni
People from Devonshire Parish